Athletes from Bahrain participated in the 2002 Asian Games held in Busan, South Korea, from September 29 to October 14, 2002. They won seven medals (including three golds), and clinched 19th spot in the medal table.

Number of athletes

References

Nations at the 2002 Asian Games
2002
Asian Games